Pierre Kwizera (born 16 April 1991) is a Burundian professional footballer, who plays as a midfielder for Rayon Sport F.C.

International career

International goals
Scores and results list Burundi's goal tally first.

Honours 
Best Player of the Year
Azam Rwanda Premier League : 2015-2016

Atlético Olympic
Runner-up
 Burundi Premier League (2): 2011–12, 2012–13

References

External links 
 

1991 births
Living people
Burundian footballers
Burundi international footballers
Association football midfielders
Expatriate footballers in Rwanda
Burundian expatriate footballers
Rayon Sports F.C. players
2019 Africa Cup of Nations players
Atlético Olympic FC players
Sportspeople from Bujumbura
Burundian expatriate sportspeople in Rwanda